Mactra chinensis is a species of saltwater clam, a marine bivalve mollusc in the family Mactridae, the trough shells.

Distribution and habitat

Mactra chinensis is found living in sandy substrates in shallow marine habitats in Vietnam, Korea, Mainland China and Taiwan.

References

Mactridae
Bivalves described in 1846